Blake Dermott (born September 10, 1961 in Edmonton, Alberta) is a former professional Canadian football offensive lineman who played fourteen seasons in the Canadian Football League for the Edmonton Eskimos, and was named the team's Top Lineman in 1988 and 1990 and CFL All-Star in 1989 and 1994. Dermott played in 5 Grey Cups and was a part of 2 Grey Cup championship teams in 1987 and 1993. Blake currently sits in 5th place all time for most games played for the Eskimos, and was the only player in Eskimo history to start a game in every position on the Offensive Line. 

Dermott played CIS football for the Alberta Golden Bears and won a gold medal at the 1982 CIS Wrestling Championships for the University of Alberta. Dermott was inducted to the University of Alberta Sports Wall of Fame in 2012. 

Dermott is currently the "In Game Analyst" on Edmonton Eskimo broadcasts for 630 CHED radio.

References

1961 births
Living people
Alberta Golden Bears football players
Canadian football offensive linemen
Edmonton Elks players
Players of Canadian football from Alberta
Canadian football people from Edmonton